Thomas or Tom Worthington may refer to:

Thomas Worthington (Douai) (1549–1627), English Catholic priest and third President of Douai College
Thomas Worthington (Dominican) (1671–1754), English Dominican friar and writer
Thomas Worthington (governor) (1773–1827), American Democratic-Republican politician from Ohio, 6th Governor of Ohio
Gen. Thomas Contee Worthington (1782–1847), American lawyer, captain in War of 1812, member of the House of Representatives in Maryland
Thomas Worthington (architect) (1826–1909), English architect
Tom Worthington (computer programmer) (born 1957), Australian computer programmer
Tom Worthington (footballer) (1866–?), Welsh international footballer

See also
Thomas Worthington High School, Worthington, Ohio